The Union of Democratic Forces-New Era (Union des Forces Démocratiques-Ère Nouvelle) was a political party in Mauritania, founded in 1991 and dissolved in 2000. The secretary-general of the party was Ahmed Ould Daddah. In February 1997 the five-party Front of Opposition Parties (FPO), including the UFD-EN, was formed; it boycotted the December 1997 presidential election, in which President Maaouya Ould Sid'Ahmed Taya was easily re-elected.

The party was weakened by a number of splits during its existence. In 1998, a faction of the party led by Mohamed Ould Maouloud, which was known as the UFD/B and later became the Union of the Forces of Progress, split from the faction under Daddah's leadership. The UFD-EN under Daddah's leadership boycotted the January 1999 local election, in which the faction under Ould Maouloud participated.

In October 2000, the UFD-EN was dissolved by the Government, which alleged that it incited violence and harmed national interests. A successor party, the Rally of Democratic Forces (RFD), was subsequently established, with Daddah as its president.

References

1991 establishments in Mauritania
2000 disestablishments in Mauritania
Banned political parties
Defunct political parties in Mauritania